"Disconnected" is a song by English alternative rock band Keane from their fourth studio album Strangeland. It was released as the album's second single on 27 April 2012 in Germany, Austria and Switzerland. The band played the song for first time during the Night Train Tour in 2010. It was released officially, worldwide, on 8 October 2012.

Music video
Spanish film directors Juan Antonio Bayona and Sergio G. Sánchez co-directed the video for "Disconnected" with Leticia Dolera in the main role. Bayona, Sanchez and Keane filmed the video inside a haunted house in Barcelona, which pays homage to the '70s horror movie aesthetic. Both Bayona and Sanchez created a surreal and moving plot which tells the story of two lovers who have become detached from each other and ultimately question the notion of reality and mortality. A video teaser was shown at keanemusic.com. The teaser premiered on 16 April 2012.

"Disconnected" won Best Video at the Q Awards in London on 22 October 2012.

Track listing

Charts

Release history

References

Keane (band) songs
2012 singles
Music videos shot in Spain
Songs written by Tim Rice-Oxley
Songs written by Tom Chaplin
Songs written by Richard Hughes (musician)
Songs written by Jesse Quin
Rock ballads
2012 songs
Island Records singles